Trichouropoda bipilis is a species of arachnid of the order Mesostigmata and the family Trematuridae.

Geographic distribution 
It is found in Austria.

References 

Mesostigmata